Microspherophakia is a rare congenital autosomal recessive condition where the lens of the eye is smaller than normal and spherically shaped. This condition may be associated with a number of disorders including Peter's anomaly, Marfan syndrome, and Weill–Marchesani syndrome. The spherical shape is caused by an underdeveloped zonule of Zinn, which doesn't exert enough force on the lens to make it form the usual oval shape. It is a result of a homozygous mutation to the LTBP2 gene.

See also
 Ectopia lentis

References

Further reading
Microspherophakia at Online Mendelian Inheritance in Man

External links 

Genetic diseases and disorders
Rare diseases
Autosomal recessive disorders
Congenital disorders of eyes
Disorders of lens